The 2021–22 Kosovar Cup is the football knockout competition of Kosovo in the 2021–22 season.

Preliminary round 
The teams of the Third League and the Second League, through elimination come up to 2 winning teams which are then joined in the Round of 32.

Round of 32 
The draw for the Round of 32 (second round) was held on 29 November 2021 in Football Federation of Kosovo's offices. 32 teams from Kosovo Superleague, First League and Second League participated in this round.

Summary 
The matches were played on 1 December and 2 December 2021. All matches started at 12:30 CET.

Round of 16 
The draw for the Round of 16 was held on 7 December 2021. 9 teams from the Kosovo Superleague, 6 from the First League and only one from the Second League will participate in this round.

Summary 
The matches will be played from 5 February until 7 February 2022. All matches will start at 13:00 CET.

Quarter-finals 
The draw for the Quarter-finals was held on 10 February 2022.

Summary 
The matches will take place on 16 and 17 March 2022.

Semi-finals 
The draw for the Semifinals was held on 31 March 2022. The first semifinal matches took place on April 7, while the return matches will be played on April 13.

First leg

Second leg

Final

Statistics

Top scorers

Notes

References

Kosovar Cup seasons
Kosovo
Cup